The Mississippi River campaigns, within the Trans-Mississippi Theater of the American Civil War, were a series of military actions by the Union Army during which Union troops, helped by Union Navy gunboats and river ironclads, took control of the Cumberland River, the Tennessee River, and the Mississippi River, a main north-south avenue of transport.

Background
In July 1863, the Trans-Mississippi Department of the Confederate States of America was split from the Confederate States east of the river when the Union gained control of the entire Mississippi River.  This cut the main east-west artery of transportation for the South, depriving the rest of the Confederacy of men, food and other supplies from the Confederate States west of the river.  While not commonly lumped together under this designation, the river campaigns were undertaken mainly for reasons found in Union General-in-Chief Winfield Scott's 1861 Anaconda Plan.  Scott proposed to defeat the Confederacy largely through blockade of ports and control of rivers leading to the economic 'strangulation' of the Confederacy, which he hoped would prevent a large number of bloody land battles.

The original Union Army expedition to control the Cumberland and Tennessee Rivers was under the overall command Major General Henry W. Halleck although Brigadier General Ulysses S. Grant commanded the forces in the field. Flag officer Andrew H. Foote commanded the Navy's squadrons. The Vicksburg and Port Hudson campaigns were commanded by Major Generals Grant and Nathaniel P. Banks, respectively while the Mississippi River Squadron was commanded by then Rear Admiral David Farragut from the south and Flag Officer David Dixon Porter from the north.

Dates and outcome
The campaign on and along the Mississippi River started in February 1862 with Union forces pushing down from Cairo, Illinois into disputed territory in Missouri and Kentucky and Confederate territory in Tennessee and ended with the surrender of the last Confederate strongholds on the Mississippi River, Vicksburg, Mississippi on July 4, 1863 and of Port Hudson, Louisiana on July 9, 1863. Flag Officer Foote initially commanded the Union naval forces, which were later led by Farragut and Porter.

Practical elements of warfare on the Mississippi
Although an important role in the Mississippi River campaign was played by armored paddle steamers, the campaign was a Union Army undertaking, as the ships used were under Army command and were used as army transports and floating gun stations rather than independent warships.  Most of their boats were either converted paddle steamers or purpose-built gunboats that had never seen the sea. Because of this, the Mississippi River Squadron quickly became known as the Brown-water navy. This was a reference to the brown, muddy water of the Mississippi, as compared to the deep blue commonly associated with the sea. The only exception was at the Siege of Vicksburg where the army, marching downstream met up with the Union Navy under Rear Admiral David Farragut sailing upstream and the two combined their forces for an all-out land-and-sea shelling of the town.

The river campaigns saw the first practical use of river gunboats and river ironclads, in particular the City-class ironclads, ironclad paddle steamers built by James B. Eads in St. Louis and Cairo, Illinois. It also saw the use of sea mines, which at that time were called torpedoes, a term applied to self-propelled warheads only later, torpedo rams and a brief Confederate experiment in deploying a casemate ironclad, the CSS Arkansas, in a river defense role.

Notable engagements
Important battles in the Tennessee and Cumberland Rivers campaign were the capture of Fort Henry and Fort Donelson, where the Union forces were under the direct command of Brigadier General U.S. Grant, who reported to Major General Halleck, and the naval forces of the Western Gunboat Flotilla, predecessor of the Mississippi River Squadron, were led by Flag Officer Andrew H. Foote. Key military actions along the Mississippi River included the Island No. 10, the Battle of Memphis, Siege of Vicksburg

See also
 Mississippi River in the American Civil War
 Seth Ledyard Phelps (commander of various gunboat fleets)
 Charles Henry Davis (replaced Admiral Foote as flag officer of Mississippi Squadron)

Sources
 Arnold, James R. Grant Wins the War: Decision at Vicksburg. New York: John Wiley & Sons, Inc., 1997. .
 Ballard, Michael B. Grant at Vicksburg: The General and the Siege. Carbondale, IL: Southern Illinois University Press, 2013. .
 Ballard, Michael B. Vicksburg, The Campaign that Opened the Mississippi. Chapel Hill: University of North Carolina Press, 2004. .
 Bearss, Edwin C. The Campaign for Vicksburg. 3 vols. Dayton, OH: Morningside House, 1985. .
 Beck, Brandon H. Holly Springs: Van Dorn, The CSS Arkansas and The Raid That Saved Vicksburg. Charleston, SC: The History Press, 2011. .
 Carter III, Samuel. The Final Fortress: The Campaign for Vicksburg 1862-1863. New York, St. Martin's Press, 1980. .
 Catton, Bruce. The Centennial History of the Civil War. Vol. 3, Never Call Retreat. Garden City, NY: Doubleday, 1965. .
 Cooling, Benjamin Franklin. Forts Henry and Donelson: The Key to the Confederate Heartland. Knoxville: University of Tennessee Press, 1987. .
 Daniel, Larry J. and Lynn N. Bock. Island No. 10: Struggle for the Mississippi Valley. Tuscaloosa: The University of Alabama Press, 1996. .
 Eicher, David J. The Longest Night: A Military History of the Civil War. New York: Simon & Schuster, 2001. .
 Esposito, Vincent J. West Point Atlas of American Wars. New York: Frederick A. Praeger, 1959. . The collection of maps (without explanatory text) is available online at the West Point website.
 Foote, Shelby. The Civil War: A Narrative. Vol. 2, Fredericksburg to Meridian. New York: Random House, 1958. .
 Gott, Kendall D. Where the South Lost the War: An Analysis of the Fort Henry-Fort Donelson Campaign, February 1862. Mechanicsburg, PA: Stackpole Books, 2011. . Originally published 2003.
 Grant, Ulysses S. Personal Memoirs of U. S. Grant. 2 vols. Charles L. Webster & Company, 1885–86. .
 Hamilton, James. The Battle of Fort Donelson. South Brunswick, NJ: T. Yoseloff, 1968. .
 Joiner, Gary D. Mr. Lincoln's Brown Water Navy: The Mississippi Squadron. Lanham, MD: Rowman & Littlefield Publishers, Inc., 2007. .
 Kennedy, Frances H., ed. The Civil War Battlefield Guide. 2nd ed. Boston: Houghton Mifflin Co., 1998. .
 Kerby, Robert L. Kirby Smith's Confederacy: The Trans-Mississippi South, 1863– 1865. Tuscaloosa and London: The University of Alabama Press, Reprint. Originally published New York: Columbia University Press, 1972. .
 Korn, Jerry, and the Editors of Time-Life Books. War on the Mississippi: Grant's Vicksburg Campaign. Alexandria, VA: Time-Life Books, 1985. .
 Knight, James R. The Battle of Fort Donelson: No Terms but Unconditional Surrender. Charleston, SC: The History Press, 2011. .
 McPherson, James M. Battle Cry of Freedom: The Civil War Era. Oxford History of the United States. New York: Oxford University Press, 1988. .
 McPherson, James M. War on the Waters: The Union & Confederate Navies, 1861-1865. Chapel Hill: University of North Carolina Press, 2012. .
 Nevin, David, and the Editors of Time-Life Books. The Road to Shiloh: Early Battles in the West. Alexandria, VA: Time-Life Books, 1983. .
 Shea, William L. and Terrence J. Winschel. Vicksburg is the Key: The Struggle for the Mississippi River. Lincoln, NE: University of Nebraska Press, 2003. .
 Simon, John Y., ed. Papers of Ulysses S. Grant: January 8 - March 31, 1862. Vol. 4. Carbondale: Southern Illinois University Press, 1972. .
 Simon, John Y., ed. The Papers of Ulysses S. Grant. Vol. 8, April 1 – July 6, 1863. Carbondale: Southern Illinois University Press, 1979. .
 Smith, Jean Edward. Grant. New York: Simon & Schuster, 2001. .
 Smith, Timothy B. Champion Hill: Decisive Battle for Vicksburg. El Dorado Hills, CA: Savas Beatie, 2004. .
 Taafe, Stephen R. Commanding Lincoln's Navy: Union Naval Leadership During the Civil War. Annapolis, MD: Naval Institute Press, 2009. .
 Tucker, Spencer C. Blue & Gray Navies: The Civil War Afloat. Annapolis, MD: Naval Institute Press, 2006. .
 Winschel, Terrence J. Triumph & Defeat: The Vicksburg Campaign. New York: Savas Beatie LLC, 2004. . First published Campbell, CA, Savas Publishing Co., 1999.
 Winters, John D. The Civil War in Louisiana. Baton Rouge: Louisiana State University Press, 1963. .
 Woodworth, Steven E. Nothing but Victory: The Army of the Tennessee, 1861–1865. New York: Alfred A. Knopf, 2005. .
 Woodworth, Steven E., and Charles D. Grear. The Vicksburg Campaign, March 29–May 18, 1863. Carbondale, IL: Southern Illinois University Press, 2013. .

Mississippi River
Campaigns of the Western Theater of the American Civil War
Riverine warfare